Roland Düringer (born 31 October 1963) is an Austrian actor, cabarettist and political activist. He appeared in more than thirty films since 1985. He founded the political party My Vote Counts!, which will participate nationwide in the Austrian legislative election, 2017 later this year.

Selected filmography

References

External links 

1963 births
Living people
Austrian male film actors